Speed Trap is a live jazz album by Peter King, recorded at Ronnie Scott's Jazz Club (Frith Street, London) in September 1994, and released in 1996 under the Ronnie Scotts Jazz House label. It features British/Canadian trumpet player Gerard Presencer who is now head of Jazz at the Royal  Academy of Music.

Track listing
"Mr. Silver" (Sylvain Beuf) – 13:48  
"My Man's Gone Now" (George Gershwin, Ira Gershwin, DuBose Heyward) – 15:37  
"T.N.K." (unknown) – 12:40  
"Naima" (John Coltrane) – 10:10  
"Speed Trap" (King) – 12:06  
"Getting On" (King) – 9:48

Personnel
Peter King – alto saxophone, soprano saxophone
Gerard Presencer – trumpet
Steve Melling – piano
Alec Dankworth – bass
Stephen Keogh – drums

References

Peter King (saxophonist) albums
Live jazz albums
1996 live albums
Albums recorded at Ronnie Scott's Jazz Club